Tachina brevirostris is a species of fly in the genus Tachina of the family Tachinidae that can be found in Canada and the United States.

References

Insects described in 1924
Diptera of North America
brevirostris